Much of Tamil grammar is extensively described in the oldest available grammar book for Tamil, the Tolkāppiyam (dated between 300 BCE and 300 CE). Modern Tamil writing is largely based on the 13th century grammar Naṉṉūl, which restated and clarified the rules of the Tolkāppiyam with some modifications.

Parts of Tamil grammar
Traditional Tamil grammar consists of five parts, namely eḻuttu, sol, poruḷ, yāppu, and aṇi.  Of these, the last two are mostly applicable in poetry.  The following table gives additional information about these parts.

Eḻuttu (writing) defines and describes the letters of the Tamil alphabet and their classification. It describes the nature of phonemes and their changes with respect to different conditions and locations in the text.

Sol defines the types of the words based on their meaning and the origin. It defines the gender, number, cases, tenses, classes, harmony, etc. This chapter also provides rules for compounding the words.

Porul defines the contents of poetry. It gives guidance on which topic to choose for poetry based on certain conditions like the nature of the land or time or the people. It gives a distinction between Agam (Internal / love life) and Puram (external / worldly life).

Yāppu defines rules for composing Traditional poetry. It defines the basic building block Asai and describes how asai should be joined to form a sīr, joining sīr for an adi.

Aṇi defines techniques used for comparing, praising and criticizing the taken topics.

Letters

The script of Tamil Language consists of 247 letters. The script falls under the category Abugida, in which consonant-vowel sequences are written as a unit. The grammar classifies the letters into two major categories. 
Prime Letters –  
Dependent Letters –

Prime Letters
12 vowels and 18 consonants are classified as the prime letters. 
The vowels:  அ (a), ஆ (ā), இ (i), ஈ( ī), உ (u), ஊ (ū), எ (e), ஏ (ē), ஐ (ai), ஒ (o), ஓ (ō), ஔ (au)
The consonants: க், ங், ச், ஞ், ட், ண், த், ந், ப், ம், ய், ர், ல், வ், ழ், ள், ற், ன்

The vowels are called uyir, meaning soul, in Tamil. The consonants are known as mey, meaning body. When the alphasyllabary is formed, the letter shall be taking the form of the consonants, that is the body, and the sound shall be that of the corresponding vowel, that is the soul.

The vowels are categorized based on the length, as short (kuril) and long(nedil). The short vowels are pronounced for a duration 1 unit, while the long vowels take two units. Based on the duration of the sound, the vowels form 5 pairs. The other two vowels ஐ(ai) and ஔ(au) are diphthongs formed by joining the letters அ(a)+இ(i) and அ(a)+உ(u). Since these two are a combination two short letters, their pronunciation takes 2 units of time, that is they fall under nedil category. ஐ(ai) and ஔ(au) can also be spelt அய் and அவ். This form is known as eḻuttuppōli and is generally not recommended.

From the 30 prime letters, the dependent letters are formed.

Dependent Letters

Tamil grammar defines 10 categories of Dependent letters.

Alphasyllabic letters  
Aidam  
Elongated vowel  
Elongated consonant  
Shortened u  
Shortened i  
Shortened ai  
Shortened au  
Shortened m  
Shortened Aidam  

The alphasyllabic letters – 216 in total – are formed by combining the consonants and the vowels. The duration of the sound is that of the vowel attached to the consonant (or the inherent vowel, in case of the pure consonants). For example, the table below shows the formation of க் based letters.

The aidam is always preceded by a single short letter and followed by a hard alphasyllabic letter. It takes half unit time for pronunciation.

In Uyiralapetai, the intrinsic vowel of the letter that is elongated is written next to it, to indicate that the letter now is pronounced for 3 units of time.

In Kutriyalukaram, the duration of the short 'u' letters of vallinam category (கு, சு, டு, து, பு, று) is reduced to half units, when the letter is found at the end of the word, preceded by multiple letters or a single nedil(long) letter.

If a word with kutriyalikaram is followed by a word with 'ய'(ya) as the first letter, the u sound is corrupted to i sound and takes a half unit of time for pronunciation.

In Aikarakurukkam and Aukarakurukkam, the duration of the letters ஐ and ஔ are reduced to 1 1/2 units if they are the first letters of the word. If situated elsewhere it is reduced to 1 unit.

Vanjiyar

In Tamil, a single letter standing alone or multiple letters combined form a word. Tamil is an agglutinative language – words consist of a lexical root to which one or more affixes are attached.

Most Tamil affixes are suffixes. These can be derivational suffixes, which either change the part of speech of the word or its meaning, or inflectional suffixes, which mark categories such as person, number, mood, tense, etc.  There is no absolute limit on the length and extent of agglutination, which can lead to long words with a large number of suffixes, which would require several words or a sentence in English.  To give an example, the word  means "for the sake of those who cannot go", and consists of the following morphemes:

Words formed as a result of the agglutinative process are often difficult to translate. Today Translations, a British translation service, ranks the Tamil word  (meaning a certain type of truancy) as number 8 in their The Most Untranslatable Word In The World list.

In Tamil, words are classified into four categories namely,
Nouns Peyarsol
Verbs Vinaisol
Particles and Pre-/Postpositions Idaisol
Adjective and Adverbs Urisol

All categories of nouns are declinable. Verbs are conjugated to indicate person, tense, gender, number and mood. The other two classes are indeclinable.

Nouns

The nouns stand for the names of objects both animate and inanimate, and abstract concepts. Nouns are the collections of names of animate/inanimate objects, places, concepts of time, names of limbs of animate/inanimate objects, qualitative nouns and verbal nouns.

Nouns of place stands for both conceptual names like town, village, heaven and real names like New York, Amsterdam.

Nouns of time includes units of time, names of days of the week, names of months and seasons.

Nouns of quality includes the nature and quality of the abstract and tangible objects. Example: names of tastes, shape, quantity, etc.

Rationality

The nouns are divided into two main classes based on rationality: The "high class", and the "lower class".

All the rational beings fall under the category of "high class". Examples could be Adult humans and deities.
All the irrational beings and inanimate objects fall under the "lower class". Examples could be animals, birds, plants and things. Since children are considered to be irrational, the word "child"   is considered "lower class" or neuter.

Noun inflection

Nouns are inflected based on number and grammatical case, of which there are 9: nominative case, accusative case, dative case, instrumental case, sociative case, locative case, ablative case, genitive case, and vocative case. If the plural is used, the noun is inflected by suffixing the noun stem with first the plural marker -kaḷ, and then with the case suffix, if any. Otherwise, if the singular is used, the noun is instead inflected by suffixing either the noun stem with the case suffix, or the oblique stem with the case suffix. An optional euphonic increment can occur before the case suffix.

When the noun ends in a vowel, a ''v'' or a ''y'' are used between the noun and the case suffix, and if the noun ends in an ''m'' this will be changed to a ''th''.

Genders and number

The grammatical gender of Tamil nouns corresponds to their natural sex. Nouns in Tamil have two numbers, singular and plural.

Masculine and feminine genders are only applicable to "higher class" nouns. Even though the genders of animals are marked in a sentence (e.g.:   "female, dog"), grammatically they are handled as a neuter noun. Thus there are five genders in Tamil, namely, masculine singular, feminine singular, high-class plural, lower-class singular, lower-class plural. These are summarized in the table below.

Pronouns

Demonstratives and Interrogatives

In Tamil, the demonstrative particles are a- (அ), i- (இ), and u- (உ) (archaic and has fallen out of use, except in Sri Lankan dialects). These demonstrative particles display deictic properties. i- (இ) is a near deixis form, which demonstrates the objects around/near the first person, while a- (அ) has distant deixis form, which demonstrates things near the 3rd person. u- (உ) was used to indicate objects near the second person, but has gradually fallen out of use. In modern Tamil i- (இ) indicates objects nearer and a- (அ) indicates objects in a distance. Using these particles demonstrative pronouns are derived. The same set of pronouns is also used as personal pronouns in 3rd person. e.g. avan (he), atu (that object/being), anta (that)

e- (எ) and yā- யா are the two important interrogative particles in Tamil. e- (எ) is used for deriving the interrogative pronouns. e.g. evaṉ (which one, 3rd person singular masculine), enta (which), etaṟku (for what?)

Personal pronouns
First person plural pronouns in Tamil, distinguish between inclusive and exclusive we. In Tamil, plural terminators are used for honorific addressing. It could be noted in both 2nd and 3rd persons. There are unique personal pronouns available for first and second persons while demonstrative pronouns are used in place of personal pronouns as well.

Verbs
Like Tamil nouns, Tamil verbs are also inflected through the use of suffixes.  A typical Tamil verb form will have a number of suffixes, which show person, number, mood, tense and voice, as is shown by the following example aḻintukkoṇṭiruntēṉ (அழிந்துக்கொண்டிருந்தேன்) "(I) was being destroyed":

Person and number are indicated by suffixing the oblique case of the relevant pronoun (ēṉ in the above example).  The suffixes to indicate tenses and voice are formed from grammatical particles, which are added to the stem. The chart below outlines the most common set of suffixes used to conjugate for person and tense, but different groups of Tamil verbs may use other sets of suffixes or have irregularities.

1Class five verbs take -iṟṟu added directly to the root (-iṉ + -tu). In the future, -um is added directly to the root of verbs in Classes I through VIII, whereas -um replaces the -iṟ- in the present stem to form the future of verbs in Classes IX through XIII (and no termination is added afterwards).

2This suffix takes an irregular present in -kiṉṟ-/-kkiṉṟ- before it. The -um future (see directly above) can be used in the plural, as well.

Tamil has three simple tenses – past, present, and future – indicated by simple suffixes, and a series of perfects, indicated by compound suffixes.  Mood is implicit in Tamil, and is normally reflected by the same morphemes which mark tense categories.  These signal whether the happening spoken of in the verb is unreal, possible, potential, or real. Tamil verbs also mark evidentiality, through the addition of the hearsay clitic .

Tamil has two voices.  The first - used in the example above - indicates that the subject of the sentence undergoes or is the object of the action named by the verb stem, and the second indicates that the subject of the sentence directs the action referred to by the verb stem.  These voices are not equivalent to the notions  of transitivity or causation, or to the active-passive or reflexive-nonreflexive division of voices found in Indo-European languages.

Auxiliaries
Tamil has no articles.  Definiteness and indefiniteness are indicated either by context or by special grammatical devices, such as using the number "one" as an indefinite article.  In the first person plural, Tamil makes a distinction between inclusive pronouns that include the listener and exclusive pronouns that do not.  Tamil does not distinguish between adjectives and adverbs – both fall under the category uriccol.  Conjunctions are called iṭaiccol.

Verb auxiliaries are used to indicate attitude, a grammatical category which shows the state of mind of the speaker, and his attitude about the event spoken of in the verb. Common attitudes include pejorative opinion, antipathy, relief felt at the conclusion of an unpleasant event or period, and unhappiness at or apprehension about the eventual result of a past or continuing event.

Sentence structure
Except in poetry, the subject precedes the object, and the verb concludes the sentence. In a standard sentence, therefore, the order is usually subject–object–verb (SOV), but object–subject–verb is also common.

Tamil is a null-subject language. Not all Tamil sentences have subjects, verbs and objects. It is possible to construct valid sentences that have only a verb, such as muṭintuviṭṭatu (முடிந்துவிட்டது, "It is completed"), or only a subject and object, such as atu eṉ vīṭu (அது என் வீடு, "That is my house").

The elements that are present, however, must follow the SOV order. Tamil does not have an equivalent for the existential verb to be; it is included in the translations only to convey the meaning. The negative existential verb, to be not, however, does exist in the form of illai (இல்லை) and goes at the end of the sentence (and does not change with number, gender, or tense). The verb to have in the meaning "to possess" is not translated directly, either. To say "I have a horse" in Tamil, a construction equivalent to "There is a horse to me" or "There exists a horse to me", is used.

Tamil lacks relative pronouns, but their meaning is conveyed by relative participle constructions, built using agglutination. For example, the English sentence "Call the boy who learned the lesson" is said in Tamil like "That-lesson-learned-boy call".

Example
A sample passage in Tamil script with transliteration.

References
 A. H. Arden, A progressive grammar of the Tamil language, 5th edition, 1942.
bgn
Lehmann, Thomas. A Grammar of Modern Tamil. Pondicherry Institute of Linguistics and Culture, 1989.

Notes

External links

 The online encyclopedia of writing systems and languages

Grammar, Tamil
Dravidian grammars